SDSL may refer to:

Symmetric digital subscriber line
Site-directed spin labeling